Kasim Hafeez is a British citizen of Pakistani heritage.  He is a speaker, writer and pro-Israel activist.  He now lives in Winnipeg, Manitoba in Canada.

Early life 
Hafeez grew up in Nottingham, England to Muslim Pakistani parents in a predominantly Pakistani Muslim neighbourhood.  While he states that his community was not particularly radical, but rather a hardworking new immigrant community of devout Pakistani Muslims, "Anti-Semitism was always in the background".  Hafeez claims that in his household the most radical antisemitism came from his own father who would praise Adolf Hitler.

Radicalism 
Hafeez says that growing up at a very turbulent time for the Muslim world there were monumental shifts taking place in the Muslim community where he lived.  He states that Muslims became politically mobilized following two seminal events: the publication of Salman Rushdie's book The Satanic Verses in the UK in 1988, and the war in Bosnia. Claiming that he became radicalized in his teen years from the propaganda being fed to him by radical groups and the casual organization he grew up around.  He eventually became drawn to radical groups and embraced anti-Israel and Antisemitic ideas. As a student at Nottingham University, Hafeez joined the Islamic Society, where, he says, images of death and destruction perpetrated by Israel against the Palestinians were regularly screened at meetings. The images were never contextualized or interpreted, serving merely to fuel preexisting hatred, he says.

Israel activism 
The turning point for Hafeez occurred when he came across Alan Dershowitz's The Case for Israel in a bookshop.  He told the Times of Israel

“I told myself that I would read his arguments, easily refute them, and that would be that".

But refutation of Dershowitz's arguments proved to be rather difficult for Hafeez. Following months of intensive research on the history of Israel and the conflict, he was so emotionally distraught that he had to leave his work and his studies.

Eventually Hafeez travelled to Israel in 2007 to see the reality, by his own admission still hoping to have his previous ideas validated. But what he saw in Israel had a life changing affect.  He describes this in the Israeli newspaper Y-net:

"I did not encounter an apartheid racist state, but rather, quite the opposite. I was confronted by synagogues, mosques and churches, by Jews and Arabs living together, by minorities playing huge parts in all areas of Israeli life, from the military to the judiciary. It was shocking and eye-opening. This wasn't the evil Zionist Israel that I had been told about."

According to Hafeez, it is "far from easy being a Zionist Muslim in England". Hafeez said he has been marginalized by his community and family. Hafeez visited university campuses around the UK presenting his talk, "The Day I Stopped Hating Israel – Confessions of an ex-Radical." In an interview with the Jewish Telegraph, Hafeez said: "It's not about being pro-Israel or pro-truth, I just want the facts to be heard. Israel is a democratic state. Muslims in Israel have more rights than possibly most Muslims in the Arab world and then there is the reality of the actual conflict. In the UK, most of us can't impact what will happen in Israel, we can't stop rockets falling from Gaza or forge a peace process, but we can tackle the delegitimisation and demonisation of Israel."

He went on to found the Israel Campaign which he says that he closed out in 2013 as he felt there were enough resources available, so he did not see the use to duplicate efforts.  Hafeez has spoken all over the world including the 2013 Global Forum on Combatting Anti-Semitism. He has appeared on radio and television and print media.

Christians United For Israel 
At some point in 2014 Hafeez joined the staff of Christians United for Israel and is still employed there now.  With CUFI he has continued to speak on campuses and be published in print media. Judging from some of Hafeez's more recent speeches he seems to have matured from what he has called 'cheerleading' for Israel to trying to encourage dialogue and discussion while not shying away from the issues.

In March 2019 Hafeez addressed the United Nations Human Rights Council, calling out the bias against Israel while referencing his own experiences of being told lies about the Jewish state.

Working for a Christian organization has raised questions about Hafeez's faith, while some written pieces as recent as March 2019 state that Hafeez is a Muslim. in his own social media he says that he is not a Muslim and does not want to be referred to as a Muslim Zionist. Hafeez now considers himself a Christian.

Other 
Hafeez has used his social media channels to show support for US Veterans, mental health issues and the Semper Fi Fund

References

External links 
Facebook Page
Twitter Page

Year of birth missing (living people)
Living people
British Zionists
British people of Pakistani descent
Converts to Christianity from Islam
Former Muslims